This is a list of airports in Puerto Rico (an unincorporated territory of the United States), grouped by type and sorted by location. It contains 19 public-use and military airports in the Commonwealth. Some private-use and former airports may be included where notable, such as airports that were previously public-use, those with commercial enplanements recorded by the FAA or airports assigned an IATA airport code.

Airports

See also 

 Puerto Rico Ports Authority – operates all public-use airports in Puerto Rico
 Transportation in Puerto Rico
 List of airports by ICAO code: T#TJ - Puerto Rico
 Wikipedia:WikiProject Aviation/Airline destination lists: North America#Puerto Rico (United States)

References 
Federal Aviation Administration (FAA):
 FAA Airport Data (Form 5010) from National Flight Data Center (NFDC), also available from AirportIQ 5010
 National Plan of Integrated Airport Systems for 2017–2021, updated September 2016
 Passenger Boarding (Enplanement) Data for CY 2016, updated October 2017
 FAA Order JO 7350.8K – Location Identifiers, effective 29 July 2010

International:
 
  – includes IATA codes

Other sites used as a reference when compiling and updating this list:
 Aviation Safety Network – used to check IATA airport codes
 Great Circle Mapper: Airports in Puerto Rico – used to check IATA and ICAO airport codes
 Abandoned & Little-Known Airfields: Puerto Rico

 
Airports
Puerto Rico
Airports
Puerto Rico